Satpuda Vikas Mandal (SVM) is a non-government organisation located in the Yawal Ranges of the Jalgaon District, Maharashtra in India. The organization aims to support local and tribal communities through education, social awareness, and agricultural science. Founded in 1953, as Gaurkheda Panchkroshi Rachnatmak Karyakari Sahakari Mandali, Satpuda Vikas Mandal has worked to bring education and technology into the region while maintaining customs and culture in the local communities it supports.

History
The Bombay government started a Sarvodaya Programme as a tribute to Mahatma Gandhi. This Programme included selection of 25-30 tribal and backward villages in every district. These villages were handed over to the volunteers who believed in the spirit of development according to Gandhian ideology. The part of Maharashtra known as East Khandesh (Jalgaon) was also covered under this programme.

The responsibility for the same was entrusted to noted freedom fighter and Gandhian Shri Dhanajinana Chaudhari. This responsibility was entrusted by the Chief Minister of the State Mr. Morarji Desai. Shri Dhanajinana Chaudhari selected 25 villages in the Satpuda range for development. Seeing the vastness of the work Mr. Madhukarrao Chaudhari and his 6 colleagues under took a socio-economic survey of these villages. Based upon the findings of the survey a plan was drawn up for the development work to be undertaken in the region. 1n 1949 the developmental work under Sarvodaya was started in this area.

Through this Programme of Sarvodaya work was undertaken for People’s Awareness, Education, Road development, Water Supply, Health and other basic necessity required for leading a good life. Efforts were made to unite forest labourers. Cooperative Societies were opened at village level. This helped in extending financial help to the villagers. Due to these developmental interventions there was a lot of anguish among the contractors and the village moneylenders. On 29 December 1952 this anguish took a violent turn when some tribals were hired to assassinate Shri Dhanajinana Chaudhari. The two objectives of this assassination were firstly to stop all these developmental interventions and secondly to develop hatred towards the Tribal Community.

This assassination of the patron and catalyst of development gave a great set back to all the social and developmental workers of the region. Keeping Gandhian ideology of not hating the sinner but the sin Mr. Madhukarrao Chaudhari and Bhausaheb Bonde again started this work for serving the people. The area was full with the thought that if one life was lost then the people would bring 10 such lives for sacrificing but the developmental work would not stop.

In the year 1953 at the age of 24 Mr. Madhukarrao Chaudhari completed his M.Com and accepted the post of director of the Sarvodaya Scheme. He was also threatened to be killed but his strong determination for social cause made him bold enough to continue with his work. Although in all the villages some work was being carried out but Mr. Madhukarrao Chaudhari was worried about the future of these programmes. He was interested in making these programmes a part of the long-term developmental initiatives. There was risk that these programmes would stop as soon as the government aid for these programmes would be stopped. It was difficult and not wise to depend upon grant by the government to foster the Gandhian values and concept of development. Hence there was requirement to bring an element of self-reliance. He shared this concept with Bhausaheb Bonde, Khushalji Patil, Kashinath Bhagwan Firke, Hirasingh Pawar, Vajirbhai Tadvi, Abbasbhai Jamadar, Govinda Borole, Dhondubhau Patil, L. M. Pawar, Balirambhau and Mirabai Chaudhari. All these people accepted this idea and they pooled some money by their efforts and created a team of 20 people. This led to creation of an organisation named “Gaurkheda Panchkroshi Rachnatmak Karyakari Sahakari Mandali” on 13 July 1953.

After this idea was communicated to the local people, they accepted the idea and the concept. They even decided to give some grain as local contribution for running this project. The first year’s contribution in the form of money had been Rupees 2,750 /-. The first President of the organization was Prof. Janardhan Dhanu alias Bhanu Chaudhari. In 1954 this organization started an Ashram School at Pal. During this course from village Udali a person named Namdeo Goma Patil who was related to Madhukarraoji donated 10 Acres of his land at Pal to the organization. The first headmaster for the school was Shri P.G. Chaudhari.

This Ashram School became a unit of development for the entire area. A Moral Education Center was also started at Pal. This provided education to the indigenous community. In 1969, the organization started D. N. Wandrekar Middle Ashram School. The first headmaster for the school was Shri R. D. Chaudhari. The students at Ashram School were given a regular education and also some knowledge about agriculture that brought labour and knowledge together. Primary Ashram Schools construction was done with the help of the government. Voluntary Shramdan2 done by the people helped in construction of middle schools. These people were teachers, students and students of government at Polytechnic College of Jalgaon. The then Governor of the State Hon. Dr. Ali Yawar Jung inaugurated this school building in 1972.

In the year 1971 the organization was transformed in the form of a Public Trust that came to be known as ‘Satpuda Vikas Mandal’. The first Secretary of this organization was Shri Sunitbhai Bonde, who was an agriculture graduate and had a wide experience of working amongst tribals in Thane district of Maharashtra.

Partnerships
Krishi Vigyan Kendra (KVK) is a front line agricultural extension center funded by the Indian Council of Agricultural Research. KVK in Pal, Jalgaon District, is primarily funded and supported by Satpuda Vikas Mandal. The two organizations work in partnership to provide education, training, scientific testing and advice to local farmers and communities in order to improve crop yields and quality.

CERES Global is a project of the not-for-profit CERES Community Environment Park, based in Melbourne, Victoria. There has been a long history of social, cultural and structural engagement between the two organizations.

Swinburne University of Technology in Melbourne, through CERES Global, has formed a partnership with SVM and the communities in the Yawal Ranges. Since 2014, groups of Swinburne ICT students have been working with SVM to implement technologies throughout local schools and organizations in the area.

See also
CERES Community Environment Park
Pal, Jalgaon district
Indian Council of Agricultural Research

References

1953 establishments in Bombay State
Rural development organisations in India
Jalgaon district
Organisations based in Maharashtra